There are 43 universities in Australia: 40 Australian universities (36 public and 4 private) and 3 international private universities. The Commonwealth Higher Education Support Act 2003 sets out three groups of Australian higher education providers: universities, other self-accrediting higher education institutions, and state and territory accredited higher education institutions.

For admissions to universities, those students who have completed Australian state curricula are granted a state-specific Australian Tertiary Admission Rank. All public-funded Australian universities use the ATAR based "selection rank" as one of their methods of admission; universities also use past study, work experience and other considerations in granting admission. The ATAR provides an indication of the overall position of the student in relation to the student body for that year across the state. The ATAR is used by state-specific centralised admission centres for admission to government-funded universities. Among the private universities, the Bond University and Torrens University also use the ATAR based state-specific centralised admission centres, while other admission to other private universities is through direct application to those universities. Following bodies allocate ATAR based selection ranks and admission for the tertiary institutions in their respective states:
 Universities Admissions Centre (UAC) in New South Wales and the Australian Capital Territory, includes admission to Torrens University, 
 South Australian Tertiary Admissions Centre (SATAC) in South Australia and the Northern Territory, includes admission to Torrens University,
 Victorian Tertiary Admissions Centre (VTAC) in Victoria, includes admission to Torrens University,
 Tertiary Institutions Service Centre (TISC) in Western Australia, 
 Queensland Tertiary Admissions Centre (QTAC) in Queensland, includes admission to Bond University.

For International Baccalaureate (IB) Australian students (Australian citizens) as well as the international students in Australia, the "Australasian Conference of Tertiary Admission Centres" (ACTAC) calculates an Australia-wide ATAR-like national rank called "Combined rank which combines results from across all states, thus enabling IB students to "apply in any Australian state or territory with confidence about how their results compare to their peers who have completed state curricula and received an ATAR", also "when completing your final year of schooling, ensure that you provide permission via your school for your IB
results to be released to Australian tertiary admissions centres. As long as you identify yourself as an IB student and
provide your IB candidate number when applying for courses, your IB scores and subject results will be received
electronically and automatically converted for the purposes of selection and meeting prerequisites."

Universities in Australia 

Universities in Australia
Universities
Australia
Australia